Crocotania is a genus of moths belonging to the family Tortricidae.

Species
Crocotania crocota Razowski & Becker, 2003

See also
List of Tortricidae genera

References

 , 2003, Boll. Zool. agr. Bachic. (2) 35 (1): 23.
 , 2005, World Catalogue of Insects 5

External links
tortricidae.com

Euliini
Tortricidae genera